Tom Wilmot is an Australian retired Anglican bishop.

Wilmot trained for the priesthood at St John's College, Morpeth. He was ordained in 1977 and served at Geraldton Spearwood and Willagee
. In 2004 he became an assistant bishop in the Anglican Diocese of Perth, serving the Goldfields Country Region until 2006 and the Eastern and Rural Region from 2007.

References

20th-century Australian Anglican priests
21st-century Anglican bishops in Australia
Living people
Assistant bishops in the Anglican Diocese of Perth
People educated at St John's College, Morpeth
Year of birth missing (living people)